Olympic Park railway station is located on the Olympic Park line, serving the Sydney suburb of Sydney Olympic Park. It is served by Sydney Trains T7 Olympic Park Line services.

History
Olympic Park station is now the only station functioning on the Olympic Park railway line, originally built as the Abattoirs Branch line to serve the state abattoirs and associated sale yards located in the area that is now Sydney Olympic Park. The line closed in stages in 1984 and 1995 when these facilities moved out of the area. After the last passenger service on the line was withdrawn in 1995, the line was rebuilt and realigned in places to serve the new stadiums and sports grounds that were being built for the 2000 Summer Olympics. 

Olympic Park station opened in 1998 at the same time as the new Sydney Showground nearby, which is used each year for the Sydney Royal Easter Show. As well as Easter Show attendees, the station was designed to support large crowds travelling to and from the stadiums and sports grounds in Olympic Park. 

After the 2000 Olympic Games, most of the sporting facilities were retained and adapted to recreational, entertainment and domestic competition uses. The Easter Show also continues to draw large crowds each year. In addition, the Sydney Olympic Park area has seen high density residential developments, as well as the development of hotels, offices and shops. As a result, in addition to transporting crowds attending sporting and other events, Olympic Park station now also fulfils a workday commuter role.

Design and construction

The design of the station by Hassell has been critically acclaimed by many. It has won the 1998 BHP Colorbond Award for innovative use of steel architecture, and the 1998 Sir John Sulman Medal, from the Royal Australian Institute of Architects. It was built by Leighton Contractors. It was opened by Premier of New South Wales Bob Carr on 8 March 1998.

The station is located on a single track balloon loop spur line, but the station itself has 2 tracks and 4 platform faces. Ordinarily, the centre island platform is used for both boarding and alighting, but this changes when the station is operating in major event mode. In this mode, the centre island platform is used by alighting passengers and the two side platforms are brought into use for boarding passengers.

Platforms and services

During special events such as the Sydney Royal Easter Show, special services to/from Lidcombe, Blacktown, Schofields & Penrith on the T1 North Shore & Western Line and Leppington on the T2 Inner West & Leppington Line, may operate to/from any of the four platforms.

Transport links
Busways operates two routes via Olympic Park station:
525: Strathfield station to Parramatta station
533: to Chatswood station

Transit Systems operates one route via Olympic Park station:
526: Strathfield station to Olympic Park wharf and Rhodes

Sydney Olympic Park metro station will be located to the north of the current station and is planned to open in the late 2020s.

References

External links

Olympic Park station details Transport for New South Wales

Easy Access railway stations in Sydney
Railway stations in Sydney
Railway stations in Australia opened in 1998
2000 Summer Olympics
Sydney Olympic Park
Buildings and structures awarded the Sir John Sulman Medal
Olympic Park railway line